Dena DeRose (born February 15, 1966) is an American jazz pianist, singer and educator. Although she began her career just as a pianist, medical problems with her hand forced her to become a vocalist as well. She has released seven solo albums.

Biography

Early life
DeRose was born in Binghamton, New York to a construction worker and a former professional ice skater with the Ice Capades. She began playing the piano at age three and soon became a fan of jazz. As a child she also played the organ and percussion, and played the piano in school bands. When she was a teenager, she used to drive to New York City to see jazz musicians like Hank Jones and Mulgrew Miller. After high school, DeRose was offered a scholarship to Concordia College but chose to attend Binghamton University instead.At age 18, DeRose joined a popular local top forty band playing electric piano and synthesizer. She also began to sing vocal harmony parts with the band's vocalist. At 21, DeRose was diagnosed with carpal tunnel syndrome and arthritis. Suffering severe pain in her right hand, she was forced to stop playing the piano. Not performing for close to a year she became depressed and turned to drugs and alcohol to help her cope. One night she was in a bar listening to Doug Beardsley's trio when someone suggested that she get up and sing. From then she sang regularly with Beardsley's trio in Binghamton. After approximately another 18 months, she had two surgeries on her right hand which enabled her to begin playing the piano again. She moved to New York City in 1991 to further her career.

Recording career
She released her debut album Introducing Dena DeRose on Amosaya Records in 1995 and a year later renegotiated with the Sharp Nine label. The album included jazz standards "Blue Skies", "How Deep Is the Ocean?" and "Ev'ry Time We Say Goodbye". Scott Yanow for AllMusic called the album "an impressive beginning". Her second album, Another World, was released in 1998 with a septet of musicians including Steve Davis, Steve Wilson, Ingrid Jensen, and Daniel Sadownick. Tracks included standards "Spring Is Here" and "In the Wee Small Hours of the Morning", and "Don't Go", which was composed by DeRose. She released two more albums on Sharp Nine, I Can See Clearly Now (2000) and Love's Holiday (2002) before moving to MAXJAZZ. Her first album on MAXJAZZ, and her fifth in all, was 2005's A Walk in the Park which featured a trio... that started working together a few years before and would go on to perform together on and off for the next dozen years...with bassist Martin Wind and drummer Matt Wilson. It included versions of Duke Ellington's "The Lonely Ones", John Lennon's "Imagine" and Cole Porter's "I Concentrate on You". She has worked with Gene Bertoncini, Ray Brown, Jay Clayton, John Clayton, Bruce Forman, Benny Golson,  Wycliffe Gordon, Jeff Hamilton,  Billy Hart, Bill Henderson, Mark Murphy, Judy Niemack, Ken Peplowski, Houston Person, Alex Riel, Marvin Stamm, Clark Terry, and Steve Turre.

Teaching
DeRose has been the Vocal Professor and Head of Jazz Vocals at the University of Music and Dramatic Arts in Graz, Austria, since 2006. A regular teacher at the Stanford Jazz Workshop for the past 20 years, she also teaches periodically at other summer camp and workshop programs including the Litchfield Summer Camp, Taller de Musics in Spain and the Prince Claus Conservatoire in Groningen, Holland.

Discography

Source:

References

External links

1966 births
American jazz pianists
American women jazz singers
American jazz singers
Binghamton University alumni
American LGBT musicians
Living people
Singers from New York (state)
People from Binghamton, New York
Jazz musicians from New York (state)
20th-century American women pianists
20th-century American pianists
Educators from New York (state)
21st-century American pianists
21st-century American women pianists
Academic staff of the University of Music and Performing Arts Graz
HighNote Records artists
American women academics
21st-century American LGBT people